Rayleigh is an impact crater in the Mare Australe quadrangle of Mars, located at 75.6°S latitude and 240.9°W longitude. It measures approximately 126 kilometers in diameter and was named after English physicist Lord Rayleigh. The name was approved by the International Astronomical Union (IAU) Working Group for Planetary System Nomenclature in 1973.

The pictures show layered features. These features may have resulted from the erosion of layers of mantle.

See also 

 22740 Rayleigh, asteroid
 Climate of Mars
 Geology of Mars
 Impact event
 List of craters on Mars
 Ore resources on Mars
 Planetary nomenclature
 Water on Mars

References 

Impact craters on Mars
Mare Australe quadrangle